Giardiinae is a sub-family of diplomonads.

References

Excavata families